Patrick Baltzar de Maré (also De Mare, de Mare, ; 27 January 1916 – 17 February 2008) was a British consultant psychotherapist with a special interest in group psychotherapy. He published several works on psychotherapy.

Maré was born in London, the third son of Bror Eric August de Maré, a timber broker of Swedish origin, and his wife Ellen Ingrid (née Tellander). His elder brother was the photographer and writer Eric de Maré. He was educated at St Cyprian's School, Wellington College, and Peterhouse, Cambridge. He trained for a medical career at St George's Hospital and qualified as a doctor in 1941. He enlisted in the Royal Army Medical Corps in 1942, and was trained for Army psychiatry by Rickman and Wilfred Bion at Northfield Hospital. It was an interesting time to work as a psychiatrist: the First World War had seen ground-breaking work in diagnosing and treating trauma, and with battle casualties arriving home, Patrick de Maré had plenty of patients to look after and study. He ran an Exhaustion Centre throughout the European campaign, at the end of which he returned to Northfield Hospital, where he joined S. H. Foulkes and Tom Main in the Northfield experiment. Northfield became the centre of a series of experiments led by these eminent physicians, which studied how to deal with trauma caused by war.

After the Second World War, Maré became a Consultant Psychotherapist at St George's Hospital. In 1952 he set up the Group Analytic Society with Foulkes, and later he participated in setting up the Institute of Group Analysis and the Group Analytic Practice. He also worked with Benaim and Lionel Kreeger at Halliwick Hospital, the short-lived therapeutic community.

Maré devoted his skills to the practice of group psychotherapy, starting in the traditional small group psychotherapeutic setting, but progressing towards the experience and application of large groups, and later still developing his main interest of the median group.

In 1960, Wilfred Foulkes and Patrick de Maré established a private clinic, the Group-Analytic Practice. From this work sprung the Group Analytic Society and then, in 1971, the Institute of Group Analysis. 

In 1972 he published Perspectives in Group Psychotherapy and in 1974 Lionel Kreeger and he published Introduction to Group Treatment in Psychiatry, which was dedicated to the patients and staff at Halliwick Hospital.

In 1975 he started a large group under the auspices of the Institute of Group Analysis; in 1976 he was joined by Robin Piper. That 'large' group settled down to a steady membership of about twenty members and became a 'median' group. In 1984 he launched a weekly seminar on large groups that, in 1986, became part of a recognised large group section of the Group Analytic Society. He worked for many years at the Group Analytic Practice in London.

David Bohm underwent psychotherapy with Maré and was heavily influenced by his work.

Patrick de Maré was an accomplished player of the accordion, banjo and ukulele. He would play his accordion at bars and cafés in Hampstead. He also had a love of opera, and would play music at his practice in Baker Street.

After a long and debilitating illness resulting from a street accident he eventually died from pneumonia at the age of 92, survived by his wife, two daughters, and numerous grandchildren and great-grandchildren.

Publications
 Perspectives in Group Psychotherapy, Allen & Unwin 1972
 Introduction to Group Treatment in Psychiatry, Butterworth 1974 — with Lionel Kreeger
 La historia del grupo grande y sus fenómenos en relación a la psicoterapia de grupo analítica / The History of Large Group phenomena in relation to group analytic psychotherapy, Spanish and English. Two columns side by side. Grup d'Anàlis Barcelona, 1988, 40 pgs & Bibliogr.
 Koinonia: From Hate through Dialogue to Culture in the Larger Group, Karnac Books 1991
 '"A Case for Mind", Group Analysis, Vol 37; NUMB 3, September 2003 — with Roberto Schollberger

Notes

References
 Blackwell, D. (2008). "Mind in Relation: Commentary on Patrick de Maré and Roberto Schöllberger's An Apologia for the Human Mind". Group Analysis, 41, 34–39.
 Lyndon, B. (1997). "The Median Group: An Appropriate Setting for the Negotiation of Hatred. An Elaboration of Ideas from the Work of P.B. de Mare. Group Analysis; 30: 131–137.
 Lyndon, B. (2000). The Telos of Patrick de Maré: A Survey of Ideas and Implications. Group Analysis; 33: 119–141.
 Pines, M. (2000). Shepherding Group Analysis: Shepherds Past, Present and Future.'' Group, Volume 24, Number 1, pp. 49–57.

External links
The DuVersity


1916 births
People educated at St Cyprian's School
People educated at Wellington College, Berkshire
Alumni of Peterhouse, Cambridge
British psychologists
British psychotherapists
Group psychotherapists
Royal Army Medical Corps officers
British Army personnel of World War II
2008 deaths
Deaths from pneumonia in the United Kingdom
20th-century psychologists